The Silicon Valley Roller Derby (SVRD) roller derby league is based in San Jose, California.  Founded in 2007, the league currently consists of three teams which compete against teams from other leagues. Silicon Valley is a member of the Women's Flat Track Derby Association (WFTDA).

History
The league played its first bout in August 2008, against the Port City Roller Girls.  SVRG was accepted into the Women's Flat Track Derby Association Apprentice Program in September 2009, and became a full member of the WFTDA in June 2010.

One former Silicon Valley skater, Brazilian Bombshell, competed for Roller Derby Brasil at the 2011 Roller Derby World Cup.

The league also supports a junior roller derby program and a recreational league.

WFTDA rankings

References

Sports teams in San Jose, California
Roller derby leagues established in 2007
Roller derby leagues in California
2007 establishments in California